Solarpark Eiche is a 26.5-megawatt (MW) photovoltaic power station located in Ahrensfelde‐Eiche, Germany, near the capital Berlin, and covers an area of .

See also 

Photovoltaic power station
PV system
List of photovoltaic power stations
Solar power in Germany
Electricity sector in Germany

References 

Eiche
Economy of Brandenburg
2011 establishments in Germany